Washington Township is a township in Lee County, Iowa.  Washington Township was organized in 1841.

References

Townships in Lee County, Iowa
Townships in Iowa